"(Remember Me) I'm The One Who Loves You" is a song written and originally sung by Stuart Hamblen, which he released in 1950. The song was a hit for Ernest Tubb the same year, and Dean Martin in 1965. Johnny Cash also covered it on his 1957 debut album Johnny Cash with His Hot and Blue Guitar!

Stuart Hamblen version
Hamblen's version reached No. 2 on Billboards chart of "Country & Western Records Most Played by Folk Disk Jockeys", No. 3 on Billboards chart of "Best-Selling Retail Folk (Country & Western) Records", and No. 4 on Billboards chart of "Most Played Juke Box Folk (Country & Western) Records."

Hamblen's version was also ranked No. 8 on Billboards ranking of 1950's "Top Country & Western Records According to Retail Sales" and No. 24 on Billboards ranking of 1950's "Top Country & Western Records According to Juke Box Plays."

Ernest Tubb version
Ernest Tubb released a version of the song in 1950, which reached No. 5 on Billboards chart of "Most Played Juke Box Folk (Country & Western) Records" and No. 7 on Billboards chart of "Best-Selling Retail Folk (Country & Western) Records."

Dean Martin version
In 1965, the song was released by Dean Martin. The song spent 7 weeks on the Billboard Hot 100 chart, peaking at No. 32, while reaching No. 7 on Billboards Easy Listening chart, and No. 14 on Canada's R.P.M. Play Sheet.

References

1950 songs
1950 singles
1965 singles
Stuart Hamblen songs
Ernest Tubb songs
Dean Martin songs
Columbia Records singles
Decca Records singles
Reprise Records singles
Songs written by Stuart Hamblen
Song recordings produced by Jimmy Bowen